The  Fearless-class landing platform docks were the first purpose-built amphibious assault vessels in the Royal Navy.

Designed as landing platform docks (LPD), they were designed to transport and land troops by sea either using Landing Craft Utility (LCU) or helicopters. As constructed, the ships have an internal dock that is accessed via the stern—while in port, vehicles can drive up the stern ramp and into the internal vehicle decks. At sea, the ships could partially submerge themselves at the stern, flooding the internal dock and allowing landing craft to come right up to the edge of the vehicle deck.

Each ship carried four LCUs in the stern dock, with four smaller landing craft on davits on the superstructure. They provided accommodation for up to 400 troops, which could be increased to 700, if no vehicles were carried.

Service
Intrepid was put into extended reserve in 1991, effectively removing her from active service. While in this state, she was used as a source of spares to maintain Fearless. Intrepid was finally withdrawn from service in August 1999. The Fearless class were the last steam-powered surface vessels in Royal Navy service (nuclear submarines use a steam turbine drive).

Ships

Notes

Amphibious warfare vessel classes
 
 
Ship classes of the Royal Navy